Carmelo Buonocore (February 19, 1912 in Capua – 1982) was an Italian professional football player.

Honours
 Serie A champion: 1937/38, 1939/40.
 Coppa Italia winner: 1938/39.

1912 births
1982 deaths
Italian footballers
Serie A players
A.C.R. Messina players
Inter Milan players
Calcio Lecco 1912 players
Association football defenders